Berlin-Spandau station is a Deutsche Bahn station in the Berlin district of Spandau on the south-western edge of the old town of Spandau. The railway junction station is one of the 80 stations classified by Deutsche Bahn as a category 2 station. It has the longest train shed in Germany.

The high-traffic station with six platform tracks is a transfer point between long-distance passenger services—Intercity-Express (ICE), Intercity (IC) and EuroCity (EC)—and regional services (S-Bahn, Regionalbahn and Regional-Express). It also provides connections to the inner city by the public transport services operated by the Berliner Verkehrsbetriebe: buses and U-Bahn line U7 at the adjacent Rathaus Spandau station.

The Berlin–Hamburg railway from the northwest and the Berlin–Lehrte railway from the west join together west of the station and the combined lines, after passing through the station, runs over a bridge over the Havel and continues to the east and then runs jointly with the Ringbahn (Ring Railway) for some distance on its way to Berlin Hauptbahnhof. The line running from the station was initially parallel with the Spandau Suburban Line of the S-Bahn, which connects with the Berlin Stadtbahn to reach Berlin Hauptbahnhof by a different route.

Spandau station is also the terminus of the S-Bahn line, although there is a proposal to extend it into the Havelland. The Bahnhof Spandau and Rathaus Spandau bus stops in front of the station entrance are served by more than ten regional bus lines and city bus lines and they constitute the most important bus node in Berlin after Hardenbergplatz next to Berlin Zoologischer Garten station.

Description 

The station has six platform tracks, four for regional and long-distance services and two for the S-Bahn. Outside the four-arch train shed there is also a freight track. It has the DB Station code of BSPD, while  the code of the S-Bahn section is BSPA.

The station building was built between 1996 and 1998, while rail railway operations continued, to the design of the architectural bureau of Gerkan, Marg and Partners. A direct platform tunnel has been built under the tracks on the western side parallel to the new street of Am Bahnhof Spandau and a path giving access to the platforms runs to the east of the entrance hall near Klosterstraße.

History

As early as 1871, there was a station at this point on the newly opened Berlin–Lehrte railway, which was called the Lehrter Bahnhof (“station on the railway to Lehrte”) to distinguish it from the Hamburger Bahnhof (“station on the railway to Hamburg”) in Spandau. This station was closed for passengers on 1 October 1890, so that local and long-distance trains only stopped in Spandau at the Hamburger Bahnhof, which was now called the Spandau Personenbahnhof (“Spandau passenger station”). The Lehrter Bahnhof took over the freight operations in Spandau and operated as Spandau freight yard (Güterbahnhof) on the grounds where the shopping centre of Spandau Arcaden (“arcades”) is now located. The half-timbered building of the former Lehrter Bahnhof was dismantled in 1890 and in 1891 the Stadtpark restaurant was built; this was demolished in 1966.

Spandau West 

This station was opened next to the freight depot on 15 July 1910, originally as Spandau Vorortbahnhof (suburban station). Its name was changed to Spandau West in the same year, about the same time as Hamburger Bahnhof (Spandau station) was renamed Spandau Hauptbahnhof (main station).

The new suburban station was better located than the main station, as it was closer to the Spandau old town (Altstadt) and the new town hall, which was under construction. The platforms were on an embankment and below the tracks at the ends of the platforms there were entrance halls connecting to Galenstraße and also to the intersection of Staakener Straße and Seegefelder Straße, where a subway led to the station of the East Havelland District Railways (Osthavelländische Kreisbahnen).

The station had three tracks next to two platforms, with the regularly-used tracks on either side of an island platform. The Spandau Suburban Line, which connected to the Stadtbahn, ended at the station. The passenger tracks of the Hamburg-Lehrter Bahn (that is the tracks of the lines to Hamburg and Lehrte that had been rebuilt as a single set of tracks between Berlin and  Spandau) from Lehrter Stadtbahnhof (Lehrter Stadtbahn station, now part of Berlin Hauptbahnhof) ran as the long-distance lines to the north and the south of the platforms.

The suburban trains from Lehrter Stadtbahn station also crossed over on to the station's passenger tracks and continued to Nauen and Wustermark over the Spandau suburban tracks. To the west of the station was the junction of the tracks of the Hamburg and Lehrte railways, where they formed the suburban and long-distance passenger tracks that ran into Berlin. The Spandau suburban line ended in Spandau at four storage sidings.

The busy flow of commuters between Berlin, Spandau, and towns in the East Havelland at the station compared to the current modest regional service is hard to imagine today. Even after the electrification of the Spandau suburban line from Berlin with the Ringbahn, the Stadtbahn and the suburban railways (referred to as the S-Bahn from 1930), the operation of steam-hauled commuter trains from the Lehrter Stadtbahn station continued.

In the 1930s, the steam-hauled suburban trains ran from Lehrter station to Spandau West station to the end of the electrified line at 10-minute intervals and then continued alternatively to Nauen or Wustermark at 20-minute intervals. Eyewitnesses reported enthusiastically on the interchange between S-Bahn and the suburban railways, because it was possible to interchange quickly and easily on the same platform.

At the current Berlin-Spandau station the complicated arrangements for interchange between the S-Bahn and regional services is an obstacle, which has led to support for the extension of the S-Bahn through Spandau to promote the recovery of commuter traffic and to promote the development of the outskirts.

On 23 August 1928, electric trains ran to Spandau, running over the Spandau Suburban Line rather than using the route of the long-distance trains. It was intended that Spandau West would be a terminus for only a few years as an extension to Wustermark or Falkensee and Nauen was always planned.

The development scheme planned in the 1930s and 1940s was partially implemented. As of 1951, the first S-Bahn trains continued through Spandau West to Falkensee or along the Lehrter Railway to Staaken. In the opposite direction it was possible to take the S-Bahn to Jungfernheide and the Ringbahn. Simultaneously the Lehrter station in Berlin was closed in 1951. Deutsche Reichsbahn terminated the steam-hauled suburban trains at the S-Bahn terminuses and only S-Bahn trains stopped at Spandau West.

The building of the Berlin Wall on 13 August 1961 affected the station indirectly. The S-Bahn trains to Falkensee were cut back to Spandau West. The S-Bahn service to Staaken was interrupted for several months. Thereafter, the line and thus also the station was affected by the boycott of the S-Bahn by West Berliners. Unneeded infrastructure was exposed to the ravages of time, maintenance was rare as services on the lines were increasingly thinned out. The S-Bahn's low point was reached when the West Berlin-based employees of Deutsche Reichsbahn went on strike from 17 September 1980. Deutsche Reichsbahn did not address the demands of the employees and almost all S-Bahn services in the western part of the city were closed. The Spandau lines, including Spandau West station, were closed on 25 September 1980. The abandoned station was only used by freight trains and passenger trains ran to and from Hamburg on the long-distance tracks without stopping.

Berlin-Spandau station

The acquisition of the S-Bahn by the Berliner Verkehrsbetriebe on 9 January 1984 was expected to lead to the reopening of the line to Staaken via a new S-Bahn station called Rathaus Spandau (rather than Spandau West). However, this was postponed, as U-Bahn line U7 was completed to Rathaus Spandau (located next to Spandau West station) on 1 October 1984.

The initial plans for the Hanover–Berlin high-speed railway were developed during the same decade. Negotiations with East Germany for what was initially intended as a transit route between West Germany and West Berlin began in autumn 1988. The fall of the Berlin Wall and the completion of negotiations with an agreement on the route in June 1990, gave further impetus to planning.

The transfer of the station from across the Havel (the former Hamburger station, later Spandau Hauptbahnhof) directly to the site near the Old Town and the Town Hall—where in any case the replacement of worn out equipment was necessary—had already been contemplated during the reconstruction of Spandau railway facilities in 1910. It was also proposed to resume S-Bahn services over the Spandau Suburban Line with the option of an extension to the west.

A design of the Spanish architect Santiago Calatrava won a closed urban design competition for the new long-distance and S-Bahn station in 1993. Calatrava imagined that the platforms would be flanked by office buildings—as later implemented for the new Berlin Hauptbahnhof. This was difficult to finance and caused a long controversy over the plan. Finally, the third-ranked design of the German architectural bureau of Gerkan, Marg and Partners was developed between 1996 and 1998 after a review of the original design, which had a roof that was open on both sides. Objections of the passenger associations during the planning approval process achieved a better design for access to the S-Bahn platform.

The first platform of the new Berlin-Spandau station was opened to traffic on 19 May 1997, initially only for long-distance and regional services. S-Bahn services were extended when the train shed was finished on 30 December 1998.

With the completion of the new Berlin railway node on 28 May 2006, the number of daily regional services was reduced from 250 to 212 and the number of long-distance services increased from 66 to 100.

The design of the station has been criticised as inadequate. The station is considered to be part of a congested railway. Passenger trains are only allowed to stop at the platform for a maximum of six minutes between 5 AM and 8 PM. Trains are only allowed to reverse at the platform if either the scheduled stay does not take longer than six minutes or it would use less capacity than to move to a siding.

Train services

The station is served by several Intercity-Express, Intercity and regional services operated by Deutsche Bahn, as well as lines S3 and S9 of the Berlin S-Bahn. The nearby Rathaus Spandau U-Bahn station is served by line U7 and numerous bus routes (including M32, M37 and M45) operated by the Berliner Verkehrsbetriebe and regional bus companies from the surrounding area.

In spring 2006, plans were finalised for an extension of a single-track S-Bahn line to Falkensee. However, its construction depended on financing becoming available. After the 2011 state election, the SPD and the CDU formed a grand coalition. The coalition agreement included a commitment to develop plans to extend the S-Bahn line "from Spandau station to the west to Falkensee".

The station is serves by the following services:

Long distance

Regional services
Regional services  Wismar – Schwerin – Wittenberge – Nauen – Berlin – Lübben – Cottbus
Regional services  Rathenow - Wustermark - Berlin - Ludwigsfelde - Jüterbog
Regional services  Berlin – Hennigsdorf – Neuruppin – Wittstock – Pritzwalk – Wittenberge
Regional services  Wismar - Schwerin  - Wittenberge - Nauen - Berlin-Spandau - Berlin Friedrichstrasse - Berlin Ostkreuz - Airport BER - Terminal 1-2
Local services  Nauen – Falkensee – Berlin
Peak hour services  Wustermark – Berlin
Local services  Nauen – Falkensee – Berlin – Berlin-Schönefeld Flughafen – Königs Wusterhausen – Senftenberg
Berlin S-Bahn services  Spandau - Westkreuz - Hauptbahnhof – Alexanderplatz – Ostbahnhof – Karlshorst – Köpenick – Erkner
Berlin S-Bahn services  Spandau - Westkreuz - Hauptbahnhof - Alexanderplatz - Ostbahnhof - Schöneweide - Flughafen Schönefeld

U-Bahn station

The Rathaus Spandau U-Bahn station is the western terminus of line U7 the Berlin U-Bahn. It was opened on 1 October 1984. Although the station is very close to Spandau S-Bahn station, it has kept its name. The buses of Berliner Verkehrsbetriebe always show the destination as S+U Rathaus Spandau, although the S-Bahn station is only signed as Spandau.

See also
Berlin-Staaken station
Berlin Albrechtshof station

References

External links

Berlin S-& U-Bahn network 2011
 

Spandau
Spandau railway station
Spandau
Railway stations in Germany opened in 1910